Lliga Catalana of Handball (English: Catalan league of Handball) was a competition organized by the Catalan Federation of Handball at the 80's and 90's decades played by the best Catalan clubs. On 1997 was replaced by the Pyrenean handball league adding teams from the south of France.

History 
 1981-82: FC Barcelona Handbol
 1982-83: F.C. Barcelona
 1983-84: F.C. Barcelona
 1984-85: F.C. Barcelona
 1985-86: BM Granollers
 1986-87: F.C. Barcelona
 1987-88: F.C. Barcelona
 1988-89: BM Granollers
 1989-90: BM Granollers
 1990-91: F.C. Barcelona
 1991-92: F.C. Barcelona
 1992-93: F.C. Barcelona
 1993-94: F.C. Barcelona
 1994-95: F.C. Barcelona
 1990-91: BM Granollers
 1996-97: F.C. Barcelona

On 1997 was replaced by the Pyrenean handball league

External links
Federació Catalana d'Handbol 

Handball in Catalonia